Sultan Mountain, elevation , is a peak of the San Juan Mountains range in San Juan County, southwestern Colorado.

It is located southwest of the town of Silverton.

See also
List of mountain peaks of Colorado

References

External links

Mountains of San Juan County, Colorado
San Juan Mountains (Colorado)
North American 4000 m summits
Mountains of Colorado